Meizoglossa is a monotypic moth genus of the family Noctuidae. Its only species, Meizoglossa bipunctata, was described from "Olilit, Tenimber", which seems to be an old name for a locality in the Tanimbar Islands of Indonesia. Both the genus and species were first described by Gustaaf Hulstaert in 1924.

References

Acontiinae
Monotypic moth genera